Bereft is a 2010 novel by the Australian author Chris Womersley.

Plot summary

In 1919 the First World War is over and Spanish Flu is at epidemic proportions in Australia. Quinn Walker returns from the war to the small town of Flint to face the consequences of his sister's killing, ageing parents and a police constable who is intent on blaming him for the death.

Awards

 2012 longlisted International Dublin Literary Award 
 2012 shortlisted The National Year of Reading 2012 Our Story Collection — New South Wales 
 2012 shortlisted Crime Writers' Association (UK) — The CWA Gold Dagger
 2011 winner Indie Awards — Fiction 
 2011 shortlisted Miles Franklin Literary Award

Notes

 Dedication: For Roslyn, who always believed.
 Epigraph: Every angel is terrible - Rainer Maria Rilke, The Duino Elegies

Reviews

 Australian Crime Fiction
 Kill Your Darlings
 The Sydney Morning Herald

References

2010 Australian novels
Scribe (publisher) books